Metropolitan Life Insurance Company Hall of Records is a historic corporate archives located at Yonkers, Westchester County, New York. It was designed by architect D. Everett Waid and built by the Metropolitan Life Insurance Company in 1906.  The Classical Revival style building consists of a two-story section built in 1906, a third floor that was added in 1920, and two additions that were constructed in 1917 and 1927.  It is constructed of steel frame and reinforced concrete, and has a brick curtain wall.  The building is "L"-shaped features a convex portico with cast stone columns at the interior of the "L".  The building housed over 56 linear miles of filing space in shelving units and cabinets and remained under Metropolitan Life's ownership until 2006.

It was listed on the National Register of Historic Places in 2014.

References

Archives in the United States
Commercial buildings on the National Register of Historic Places in New York (state)
Neoclassical architecture in New York (state)
Commercial buildings completed in 1906
Buildings and structures in Yonkers, New York
National Register of Historic Places in Yonkers, New York
MetLife
1906 establishments in New York (state)